Beaches FC is a football club of Turks and Caicos.

They play in the Turks and Caicos first division, the WIV Provo Premier League. They were champions in 2002 and 2006−07.

Achievements
WIV Provo Premier League: 3
 2002, 2006−07, 2017.

Current squad

References

Football clubs in the Turks and Caicos Islands